RASD TV is the Sahrawi state-owned satellite and terrestrial public-service television broadcaster. Its offices are located in the Sahrawi refugee camps of Tindouf Province, Algeria.

History 

The channel was established in February 2004, but due to the harsh conditions in the refugee camps, did not start its regular broadcasting until May 20, 2009. The channel had previously made broadcasting proof emissions since 2008, through Hispasat satellite.

Programming 

RASD TV broadcast daily for four hours by terrestrial signal (for the Western Sahara territory and the refugee camps) and two hours by satellite (for the rest of Africa, Europe and part of the Middle East), with its content, composed of newscasts, interviews, historical documentaries and cultural programs, mostly in Hassaniya and Modern Standard Arabic, but also some in Spanish.

See also 
 Radio Nacional de la R.A.S.D.
 Sahara Press Service

References

External links 
 RASD TV on LyngSat Address

Arabic-language television stations
Television stations in Algeria
Television channels and stations established in 2004
Mass media in Western Sahara